Anti-Japanese propaganda can refer to:
 American World War II anti-Japanese propaganda
 British World War II anti-Japanese propaganda
 Chinese World War II anti-Japanese propaganda